is a Japanese handballer for MIE violet' IRIS and the Japanese national team.

She participated at the 2011 World Women's Handball Championship in Brazil.

References

External links

1987 births
Living people
Japanese female handball players
Expatriate handball players
Japanese expatriate sportspeople in Hungary
Fehérvár KC players
Handball players at the 2010 Asian Games
Handball players at the 2014 Asian Games
Handball players at the 2018 Asian Games
Asian Games silver medalists for Japan
Asian Games bronze medalists for Japan
Asian Games medalists in handball
Medalists at the 2010 Asian Games
Medalists at the 2014 Asian Games
Medalists at the 2018 Asian Games
People from Fukui (city)
Handball players at the 2020 Summer Olympics
20th-century Japanese women
21st-century Japanese women